Kubus Mountain is a distinctive blocky mountain, rising  to   southeast of Trollslottet Mountain, in the northwestern part of the Filchner Mountains of Queen Maud Land, Antarctica. It was discovered by the Third German Antarctic Expedition under Ritscher, 1938–39, and given the descriptive name Kubus (the cube).  Aurkleven Cirque lies between Klevekampen and Kubus.

References

Mountains of Queen Maud Land
Princess Astrid Coast